A Lass o' the Looms is a 1919 British silent drama film directed by Jack Denton and starring Stella Muir, Henry Victor and Douglas Payne.

Cast
 Stella Muir as Nellie Hesketh  
 Henry Victor as Jack Brown  
 Douglas Payne as Foreman  
 Betty Hall as Girl

References

Bibliography
 Palmer, Scott. British Film Actors' Credits, 1895-1987. McFarland, 1998.

External links
 

1919 films
1919 drama films
British drama films
British silent feature films
Films directed by Jack Denton
British black-and-white films
1910s English-language films
1910s British films
Silent drama films